Plymouth Gold (formerly Classic Gold 1152) was a radio station broadcasting to the city of Plymouth in Devon and surrounding areas. It is owned by GCap Media and was part of the national Classic Gold Digital Network. It broadcasts on 1152 kHz AM, DAB digital radio, as well as online  and on Sky Digital Channel 0189 (the latter two were the national versions of Classic Gold, lacking the local elements). Based at Earl's Acre, Plymouth, its sister station is Heart Plymouth, formerly known as Plymouth Sound until 2009.

History

Plymouth Gold was launched on 19 May 1975, as Plymouth Sound, broadcasting on 97.0 FM and 261 metres medium wave (1152 AM). It was one of the earliest ILR's to launch in the UK and was the first commercial radio station for the West Country.

Towards the end of the 1980s/ early 1990s, as with most other ILRs Plymouth Sound split into two stations; the FM frequency remained as Plymouth Sound and the AM service became Plymouth Sound AM. After being owned (either fully or partly) by the GWR Group, the Capital Group and The Local Radio Company, throughout the 1990s, the station was fully bought by the GWR Group around 2000. On 7 February 2000 Plymouth Sound AM was re-branded Classic Gold 1152 (Plymouth). Due to ownership rules the GWR Group had to sell off all of their Classic Gold stations. They were sold to the UBC Media Group, although the GWR Group did keep a 20% stake in the brand. The 20% stake was increased to 100% in 2007 and GCap assumed full control of both Capital Gold and the Classic Gold Digital Network, merging the two networks, and renaming it simply Gold on 3 August.

Present day

Plymouth Gold until recently, had around 20 hours a day of networked programming. Only the weekday drivetime show was local and was presented by Peter Greig. Network shows still have local adverts, information and news aired at selected intervals. The station plays the best songs from the 1960s to today (although songs from the 1960s, 1970s and 1980s do predominate). According to the RAJAR results for the period ending December 2006, the station had a total of 6,000 listeners and a 1.1% market share.

Network programmes under Classic Gold

 The Even Tastier Breakfast
 The Graham Rogers Morning Show
 Classic Gold Drivetime (local programme)
 Paul Baker's Evening Show
 Classic Gold Late Night
 The Retro Countdown
 Classic Gold Albums

Notable Network presenters

 Tony Blackburn
 Paul Burnett
 Gary Crowley
 Trevor Dann
 Chris Hawkins
 Graham Rogers
 Sandy Warr

Past network presenters

 Simon Bates
 David Hamilton
 Noddy Holder
 Dave Lee Travis
 Mike Read
 Emperor Rosko
 Jimmy Savile
 Johnnie Walker

References
  Aircheck UK 
 Classic Gold 1152 (Plymouth) Media UK entry

External links
 
 Classic Gold 1152 (Plymouth) Media UK entry

Radio stations in Devon
Mass media in Plymouth, Devon
GCap Media
Defunct radio stations in the United Kingdom